This is a list of Minister of Education and Culture for the Republic of Cyprus since the independence in 1960.

References

External links 
 Official list on the Web site of the Ministry

Education